Lebertia is a genus of mites belonging to the family Lebertiidae.

Species:
 Lebertia aberrans Sokolow, 1934 
 Lebertia aberrata Viets, 1922

References

Trombidiformes